The 2008 Berlin Marathon was the 35th edition of the Berlin Marathon. The marathon took place in Berlin, Germany, on 28 September 2008 and was the fourth World Marathon Majors race of the year.

The men's race was won by Haile Gebrselassie in 2:03:59 hours and the women's race was won by Irina Mikitenko in a time of 2:19:19 hours.

Results

Men

Women

References

External links

35st Berlin Marathon

Berlin Marathon
Berlin Marathon
2008 in Berlin
Berlin Marathon